Saman Veisi (Persian: سامان ویسی , born 7 August 1982) is an Iranian professional basketball player. He currently plays for Foolad Mahan in the Iranian Super League, as well as for the Iranian national basketball team, as a guard.

References

External links
 Profile
 Asia-Basket Profile 
 RealGM profile

1982 births
Living people
Asian Games bronze medalists for Iran
Asian Games medalists in basketball
Basketball players at the 2006 Asian Games
Iranian expatriate basketball people in China
Iranian men's basketball players
Medalists at the 2006 Asian Games
Petrochimi Bandar Imam BC players
Point guards
Shooting guards
2010 FIBA World Championship players
People from Sanandaj
Islamic Solidarity Games competitors for Iran